József Varga (born 6 June 1988) is a Hungarian professional footballer who plays as a defensive midfielder for the Hungarian club Debrecen.

Club career

Early years
Varga was seven years old when he started playing football, influenced by his father. Playing primarily as a striker he made his breakthrough in 2000. In the 2007–08 season he started in the Debrecen B team before moving on to play for their A team.

Debrecen

Varga's first trophy was won against Budapest Honvéd by 4–1 on aggregate. The first leg finished 1–1 in the Bozsik Stadion. In the UEFA Champions League 2007–08 season Debrecen entered in the second qualifying round. Debrecen faced with the Swedish champion IF Elfsborg. Debreceni VSC were eliminated from the Champions League 1–0 on aggregate. In the Hungarian League 2007–08 season, Varga's team finished second while MTK became first. Debrecen won the Hungarian Cup in the 2007–08 season by beating Budapest Honvéd in the final 9–1 on aggregate. Debrecen played in the 2008–09 UEFA Cup. In the first round of the Central-East region they drew in Kazakhstan against Shakhter Karagandy 1–1, while in the second leg they beat the Kazakh team by 1–0. Debrecen qualified for the second round by 2–1 on aggregate. In the second round Debrecen faced with the Swiss BSC Young Boys. Debrecen were eliminated from the UEFA Cup by 3–7 on aggregate. Rudolf won the 2008–09 Nemzeti Bajnokság I season after beating their provincial rivals Diósgyőri VTK 3–2 away. In the 2009–10 season, Debrecen played in the UEFA Champions League. After beating Kalmar FF, Levadia Tallinn, and Levski Sofia Debrecen reached the group stages of the 2009–10 UEFA Champions League season. Varga scored a goal against Levski in the Puskás Ferenc Stadium.

On 1 May 2012, Varga won the Hungarian Cup with Debrecen by beating MTK Budapest on penalty shoot-out in the 2011–12 season. This was the fifth Hungarian Cup trophy for Debrecen. On 12 May 2012, Varga won the Hungarian League title with Debrecen after beating Pécs in the 28th round of the Hungarian League by 4–0 at the Oláh Gábor út Stadium which resulted the sixth Hungarian League title for the Hajdús.

Greuther Fürth (loan)
On 30 January 2013, Varga joined Bundesliga club Greuther Fürth on loan from Debrecen until the end of the 2012–13 Bundesliga season. Varga was watched by several Premier League clubs including Swansea but Varga decided to move to Bavaria. On 1 February 2013, Varga played his first Bundesliga match in 2–1 victory over Schalke 04 in Gelsenkirchen at the Veltins-Arena.

Middlesbrough (loan)
On 25 June 2013, Varga signed on a season-long loan with English team, Middlesbrough. He was assigned the number 8 shirt previously worn by Newcastle United loanee Sammy Ameobi last season. He made his debut for the English side in the opening match of the 2013–14 Championship season against Leicester City during an eventual 1-2 home loss. He was deployed by manager Tony Mowbray on the right-wing.
He was later played at right back against Millwall and Burnley under the new management of Aitor Karanka, both performances were man of the match performances.

At the end of the season Varga returned to Debrecen after Middlesbrough refused to take up the option to buy Varga for €650,000 Middlesbrough boss Aitor Karanka stated this was because Varga was not a natural right back and to employ him as so would be a detriment to the player himself.

International career

József Varga debuted in the Hungarian national football team on 10 October 2009 against Portugal. However Hungary lost to 3–0 at the Estádio da Luz in Lisbon Varga's performance was convincing, therefore he became a stable member of the national team during the coaching of the Dutch Erwin Koeman. Since then Varga was called up many times and he even played a defender against Sweden in the Euro 2012 qualifiers at the Puskás Ferenc Stadium because two of the key defenders Roland Juhász and Vilmos Vanczák could not play. Hungary beat 2–1 Sweden so his performance in the defence contributed to the success of the team.

Career statistics

Club

International

Honours

Club
Debrecen
 Hungarian League: 2009, 2010, 2012
 Hungarian Super Cup: 2009, 2010
 Hungarian Cup: 2008, 2010, 2012
 Hungarian League Cup: 2010

Individual
 Nándor Hidegkuti Prize: 2009
 Zilahi Prize: 2012

References

External links
 József Varga profile at magyarfutball.hu
 József Varga at dvsc.hu 

1988 births
Living people
Sportspeople from Debrecen
Hungarian footballers
Hungary under-21 international footballers
Hungary international footballers
Association football midfielders
Debreceni VSC players
Létavértes SC players
SpVgg Greuther Fürth players
Middlesbrough F.C. players
Fehérvár FC players
Puskás Akadémia FC players
Nemzeti Bajnokság I players
Bundesliga players
English Football League players
Hungarian expatriate footballers
Expatriate footballers in Germany
Expatriate footballers in England
Hungarian expatriate sportspeople in Germany
Hungarian expatriate sportspeople in England